Goodenia malvina is a species of flowering plant in the family Goodeniaceae and is endemic to north-western Australia. It is a prostrate to low-lying herb with egg-shaped to lance-shaped leaves on the stems and racemes of mauve to pinkish and yellowish flowers.

Description

Taxonomy and naming
Goodenia malvina was first formally described in 1990 Roger Charles Carolin in the journal Telopea. The specific epithet (malvina) means "mauve", referring to the colour of the flowers.

Distribution and habitat
This goodenia grows in cracking clay soil in the north-eastern Kimberley region of Western Australia and Arnhem Land in the Northern Territory.

Conservation status
Goodenia malvina is classified as "Priority One" by the Government of Western Australia Department of Parks and Wildlife, meaning that it is known from only one or a few locations which are potentially at risk and as "data deficient" under the Northern Territory Government Territory Parks and Wildlife Conservation Act 1976.

References

malvina
Eudicots of Western Australia
Plants described in 1990
Taxa named by Roger Charles Carolin
Endemic flora of Australia